The Volleyball 2018–19 V.League Division 1 Men's was the 25th tournament year and the 1st top level men's tournament of the newly branded and reorganized V.League (Japan). It was held from October 26, 2018 – April 14, 2019.

Clubs

Personnel

Foreign players
The total number of foreign players is restricted to one per club. Player from Asian Volleyball Confederation (AVC) nations are exempt from these restrictions.

Transfer players

Stadiums

Squads

Season standing procedure
The teams will be ranked by the most point gained per match as follows:
Match won 3–0 or 3–1: 3 points for the winner, 0 points for the loser
Match won 3–2: 2 points for the winner, 1 point for the loser
Match forfeited: 3 points for the winner, 0 points (0–25, 0–25, 0–25) for the loser
 In the event of a tie, the following first tiebreaker will apply: Total number of victories (matches won, matched lost) 
 If teams are still tied after examining points gained and the number of victories, then the FIVB will examine the results in order to break the tie in the following order:
Set quotient: if two or more teams are tied on total number of victories, they will be ranked by the quotient resulting from the division of the number of all set won by the number of all sets lost.
Points quotient: if the tie persists based on the set quotient, the teams will be ranked by the quotient resulting from the division of all points scored by the total of points lost during all sets.
If the tie persists based on the point quotient, the tie will be broken based on the team that won the match of the Round Robin Phase between the tied teams. When the tie in point quotient is between three or more teams, these teams ranked taking into consideration only the matches involving the teams in question.

Regular round

League table

Standings 

Updated to match(es) played on 24 February 2019.
Source: Ranking Table V.league Division 1 Men's 2018–19

Positions by round

Results by match played

Results table

Leg 1

Leg 2

Leg 3

Head-to-head results

Leg 1

Week 1

Stadium

Results
 All times are Japan Standard Time (UTC+09:00).

|}

Week 2

Stadium

Results
 All times are Japan Standard Time (UTC+09:00).

|}

Week 3

Stadium

Results
 All times are Japan Standard Time (UTC+09:00).

|}

Week 4

Stadium

Results
 All times are Japan Standard Time (UTC+09:00).

|}

Week 5

Stadium

Results
 All times are Japan Standard Time (UTC+09:00).

|}

Leg 2

Week 1

Stadium

Results
 All times are Japan Standard Time (UTC+09:00).

|}

Week 2

Stadium

Results
 All times are Japan Standard Time (UTC+09:00).

|}

Week 3

Stadium

Results
 All times are Japan Standard Time (UTC+09:00).

|}

Week 4

Stadium

Results
 All times are Japan Standard Time (UTC+09:00).

|}

Week 5

Stadium

Results
 All times are Japan Standard Time (UTC+09:00).

|}

Leg 3

Week 1

Stadium

Results
 All times are Japan Standard Time (UTC+09:00).

|}

Week 2

Stadium

Results
 All times are Japan Standard Time (UTC+09:00).

|}

Week 3

Stadium

Results
 All times are Japan Standard Time (UTC+09:00).

|}

Week 4

Stadium

Results
 All times are Japan Standard Time (UTC+09:00).

|}

Week 5

Stadium

Results
 All times are Japan Standard Time (UTC+09:00).

|}

Final stage

Final 6

Standing Procedure
 Total points (win points of final 6 and the ranking points of regular round)
Ranking points of regular round; 1st place – 5 point, 2nd place – 4 point, 3rd place – 3 point, 4th place – 2 point, 5th place – 1 point, 6th place – 0 point
 In the event of a tie, the following first tiebreaker will apply: The ranking points of regular round
 If teams are still tied after examining total points and the ranking points of regular round, then the FIVB will examine the results in order to break the tie in the following order:
The teams will be ranked by the most point gained per match in Final 6 as follows:
Match won 3–0 or 3–1: 3 points for the winner, 0 points for the loser
Match won 3–2: 2 points for the winner, 1 point for the loser
Match forfeited: 3 points for the winner, 0 points (0–25, 0–25, 0–25) for the loser
Total number of victories in Final 6 (matches won, matched lost)
Set quotient: if two or more teams are tied on total number of victories, they will be ranked by the quotient resulting from the division of the number of all set won by the number of all sets lost.
Points quotient: if the tie persists based on the set quotient, the teams will be ranked by the quotient resulting from the division of all points scored by the total of points lost during all sets.
If the tie persists based on the point quotient, the tie will be broken based on the team that won the match of the Round Robin Phase between the tied teams. When the tie in point quotient is between three or more teams, these teams ranked taking into consideration only the matches involving the teams in question.

Standings

Results

Final 3

|}

Final

|}

All–Star Game

Final standing

Awards

Most Valuable Player
 Michał Kubiak

Winner Head Coach
 

Top Scorer
 Dmitry Muserskiy

Best Spiker
 Dmitry Muserskiy

Best Blocker
 

Best Server
 Yuji Nishida

Best Serve Receiver
 Koichiro Koga

Best Receiver
 Takeshi Nagano

Best Libero
 Koichiro Koga

Best New Player
 Issei Otake
 Yuji Nishida

Best 6
 Michał Kubiak
 Thomas Edgar
 Dmitry Muserskiy
 Kenji Shirasawa
 Taishi Onodera
 Hideomi Fukatsu

Statistics leaders

Regular round

Individual
The statistics of each group follows the vis reports. The statistics include 4 volleyball skills; serve, reception, spike, and block. The table below shows the top 10 ranked players in each skill plus top scorers at the completion of the tournament.
.

Attendances

Overall statistical table
.

See also
 2018–19 V.League Division 1 Women's

References

External links
 Official website 

V.Premier League Men
V.Premier League Men
Men's
2018 in Japanese sport
2019 in Japanese sport